No Greater Glory: The American Civil War is a 1991 video game published by Strategic Simulations.

Gameplay
No Greater Glory: The American Civil War is a game in which the player leads either the North or South in a strategic simulation of the American Civil War.

Reception
M. Evan Brooks reviewed the game for Computer Gaming World, and stated that "Overall, NGG is a challenging simulation, but one that will require much effort by the gamer in order to achieve victory by either side. This reviewer still finds the game to be a significant challenge."

Reviews
ASM (Aktueller Software Markt) - Feb, 1992
ASM (Aktueller Software Markt) - Mar, 1993
Computer Gaming World - Jun, 1993
Amiga Action
Game Players PC Entertainment
Computer Games Strategy Plus
Amiga Format
CU Amiga

References

1991 video games
American Civil War video games
Amiga games
Classic Mac OS games
Cultural depictions of Abraham Lincoln
DOS games
Government simulation video games
Strategic Simulations games
Video games based on real people
Video games developed in the United States